Savannah High School may refer to:

Savannah High School (Georgia) — Savannah, Georgia
Savannah High School (Missouri) — Savannah, Missouri
Savanna High School — Anaheim, California